Radocyna  (Radotsyna) is an uninhabited village in the administrative district of Gmina Sękowa, within Gorlice County, Lesser Poland Voivodeship, in southern Poland, close to the border with Slovakia.

References

Radocyna